"You Rascal You" is an American song written by Sam Theard in 1929, and legally titled "I'll Be Glad When You're Dead." The lyrics take the form of threats and complaints leveled against a man who has repaid the singer's hospitality and kindness by running off with the singer's wife.

Popular versions of the song were released by The Mills Brothers (#3 Pop, 1932), Red Nichols & His Five Pennies (#17 Pop, 1931), Cab Calloway (#17 Pop, 1931) and Louis Armstrong (#13, 1931).

It has also been recorded by Clarence Willams, Sidney Bechet, Fats Waller, Tampa Red, Louis Jordan, Jimmie Noone, Cab Calloway, Champion Jack Dupree, Louis Prima, Fats Domino, John Fogerty, Dr. John, Henry "Rufe" Johnson, Serge Gainsbourg alone and in a duet with Eddy Mitchell, Ingrid Michaelson, Taj Mahal, and Hanni El Khatib, whose version was used in a television advertisement for the movie The Imposter.

Theard made a follow-up song in 1930 titled "I Done Caught That Rascal Now".

In other media

Louis Armstrong and his orchestra performed the song in the Betty Boop cartoon I'll Be Glad When You're Dead, You Rascal You (1932). It is also performed by, then child star, Sammy Davis Jr. in Rufus Jones for President  (1932). Armstrong also had a history of performing this song live, notably dedicating it to the police at the Peabody Hotel in Memphis after being arrested earlier for sitting next to his manager's white wife on the bus.

The song can also be found in the Gary Cooper movie, The General Died at Dawn (1936).  Part of this song is sung by the character Brighton, played by William Frawley.

The song opens Grumpier Old Men.

This song was also performed in the 1942 movie Reunion in France.

The song is referenced and reproduced in part in Isaac Asimov's novel I, Robot.

The song is referenced in Rudolph Fisher's novel The Conjure-Man Dies: A Mystery Tale of Dark Harlem (1932).

The song is referenced repeatedly, music is on audio trace, and snatches are sung in the Made for HBO movie, The Last of the Blonde Bombshells (2000) with Judi Dench, Olympia Dukakis, Ian Holm, Billie Whitelaw and Joan Sims.  It becomes a shared catchphrase between her character and that character's granddaughter.

The song is featured in the 2019 film, Bolden, performed by Reno Wilson as Louis Armstrong.

References

American songs
Songs about death
1929 songs
1932 singles
Songs written by Sam Theard